Elections to the Assam Legislative Assembly were held in February 1962. A total of 409 candidates contested the 105 constituencies. 101 men and four women were elected. The Indian National Congress won the popular vote and a majority of seats and Bimala Prasad Chaliha was appointed as the Chief Minister of Assam. The All Party Hill Leaders Conference won eleven seats and independent contestants won eight seats.

Of the 105 seats in the Legislative Assembly, 77 were general, 23 were for scheduled tribes and five were for scheduled castes.

Results

Elected members

See also
List of constituencies of the Assam Legislative Assembly
1962 elections in India

References

Assam
State Assembly elections in Assam
1960s in Assam